Strahovlje is a small settlement in the Municipality of Zagorje ob Savi in central Slovenia. The settlement is part of the traditional region of the Upper Carniola and is included in the Central Sava Statistical Region.

History
Strahovlje was part of Šemnik until 2008, when it was separated from it and made a separate village.

References

Populated places in the Municipality of Zagorje ob Savi
Populated places established in 2008
2008 establishments in Slovenia